5333 Kanaya, provisional designation , is a carbonaceous asteroid from the inner regions of the asteroid belt, approximately 14 kilometers in diameter.

The asteroid was discovered on 18 October 1990, by Japanese astronomers Makio Akiyama and Toshimasa Furuta at Mishima Observatory in Susono, Japan, and named for the Japanese city of Kanaya.

Orbit and classification 

Kanaya orbits the Sun in the inner main-belt at a distance of 2.0–2.7 AU once every 3 years and 7 months (1,312 days). Its orbit has an eccentricity of 0.17 and an inclination of 11° with respect to the ecliptic.

A first precovery was taken at the Goethe Link Observatory in 1954.

Physical characteristics 

In the SMASS classification, Kanaya is a Ch-type asteroid, a hydrated sub-type of the carbonaceous C-type asteroids.

Diameter and albedo 

According to the space-based surveys carried out by the Japanese Akari satellite and NASA's Wide-field Infrared Survey Explorer with its subsequent NEOWISE mission, Kanaya measures 14.2 and 13.6 kilometers in diameter, and its surface has an albedo of 0.029 and 0.051, respectively.

The Collaborative Asteroid Lightcurve Link assumes a standard albedo for carbonaceous asteroids of 0.057 and calculates a diameter of 13.4 kilometers with an absolute magnitude of 13.1.

Lightcurves 

Several rotational lightcurves of Kanaya have been obtained from photometric observations. In December 2005, a first lightcurve by astronomer David Higgins at Hunters Hill Observatory, Australia, gave a rotation period of  hours with a brightness variation of 0.22 magnitude.

In October 2010, Czech astronomer Petr Pravec obtained another well-defined period of  hours with an amplitude of 0.16 magnitude. Other observations rendered similar periods.

Naming 

This minor planet was named for the Japanese town of Kanaya (金谷町 Kanaya-chō) in Haibara District of the Shizuoka Prefecture. It is the native town of the first discoverer, Makio Akiyama, and also a station on the ancient "Tokai-do" road. The Malinohara plateau south of Kanaya is well known for its production of green tea. The official naming citation was published by the Minor Planet Center on 6 February 1993.

Notes

References

External links 
 Pravec, P.; Wolf, M.; Sarounova, L. (2010)
 Asteroid Lightcurve Database (LCDB), query form (info )
 Dictionary of Minor Planet Names, Google books
 Asteroids and comets rotation curves, CdR – Observatoire de Genève, Raoul Behrend
 Discovery Circumstances: Numbered Minor Planets (5001)-(10000) – Minor Planet Center
 
 

005333
Discoveries by Makio Akiyama
Discoveries by Toshimasa Furuta
Named minor planets
005333
19901018